Sherlock in Russia (also known as Sherlock: The Russian Chronicles) is a Russian detective TV series based on Arthur Conan Doyle's stories about the legendary detective Sherlock Holmes. This is the third Russian adaptation of the character and the first with original script. The series was released in October 2020 on the Start.ru streaming service.

Synopsis 
Jack the Ripper leaves behind a trail of victims and escapes from London to Saint-Petersburg. Sherlock Holmes leaves Doctor Watson in Britain and goes after the deadly killer to Saint Petersburg.

In Russia, he meets Doctor Kartsev, from whom he rents a living room. Dr. Kartsev starts helping him solve very strange, confusing, and complicated crimes, and Holmes is once again forced to convince law enforcement authorities of the correctness of his deductive methods of investigation.

Cast 
 Maksim Matveyev as Sherlock Holmes
 Vladimir Mishukov as Dr. Kartsev
 Irina Starshenbaum as Sofya Kasatkina
 Pavel Maykov as Lavr Trudniy, collegiate assessor, head of the detective police of St. Petersburg, prototype   Inspector Lestrade
 Konstantin Bogomolov as Pyotr Znamenskiy, Major General, Chief of Police of St. Petersburg
 Konstantin Yushkevich as Dr. Bakhmetyev, prototype   Professor Moriarty
 Yevgeny Dyatlov as Kobylin
 Kirill Gordleev as Koshko
 Yevgeny Sannikov as Ilya Moiseev
 Yevgenia Mandzhieva as Aigul Valikhanova, curator-archivist of the Museum of the Saint Petersburg Mining University
 Oksana Bazilevich as Madam Manuylova, prototype    Mrs. Hudson
 Fyodor Fedotov as Anton Sviridov
 Yevgeny Romantsov as Kat
 Fyodor Pisarenko as Venya Kasatkin, Sophia's deaf and dumb little son
 Valery Kukhareshin as Albert Ludwigovich Dreitsen
 Andrey Feskov as Dr. John Watson
 Aleksey Vdovin as Inspector Lestrade

Production 
Filming began in St. Petersburg in spring 2019. The director was Nurbek Egen. He has already shot such series and films as “Alibi”, “Secret Sign” and other detective dramas on Russian television. Oleg Malovichenko worked on the script, his previous works were “Ice”, “Method”, “Attraction” and others. The series is not a full-fledged adaptation of Arthur Conan Doyle's works; it is based on an original script.

Producer Aleksander Remizov claimed: “The plot is based on exciting and mysterious crimes that Sherlock would never have encountered in his native England. We will show the viewer a story familiar to everyone, but on the other side. The unification of cultures through the adaptation of the Englishman in Russia, new crimes and love are the components of the project that create a new story - 'Sherlock in Russia'”.

See also 
Sherlock Holmes vs. Jack the Ripper
Sherlock Holmes (2013 TV series)

References

External links 
 

Sherlock Holmes television series
Television series about Jack the Ripper
2020s Russian television series
2020 Russian television series debuts
2020 Russian television series endings
Russian drama television series
Russian television miniseries
Russian crime television series
Television shows based on British novels
Films shot in Russia
Russian-language television shows